Rubina Nature Reserve is a nature reserve in Viljandi County in southern Estonia.

The nature reserve is aimed at protecting the rare forested wetland landscape in the area, and the flora and fauna that thrives there. The area, rich in bogs, swamps and lakes, is an important resting place for migratory birds, but also supports a permanent population of birds such as black stork and white-tailed eagle. The wetlands in the area also support fish, such as the protected European weatherfish (Misgurnus fossilis). The flora in the nature reserve is notable for the large number of unusual orchids that can be found there.

References

Nature reserves in Estonia
Forests of Estonia
Wetlands of Estonia
Tõrva Parish
Viljandi Parish
Geography of Viljandi County
Landforms of Viljandi County